Guildford Bason (or Basin) is a former cricket ground on Merrow Down, on the outskirts of Guildford, Surrey.

Cricket was played on the ground between 1730 and 1786. Three first-class matches were staged between 1772 and 1777.

Sussex lawyer John Baker, a regular spectator at Georgian matches, described some of the matches held in his diary. One is the All-England v Hampshire game in July 1772 which Baker attended with his parson friend, John Woodward. He writes that Hambledon was already batting when they arrived. It was a cheerful scene and "the Basin on Merrow Down" was ringed by a big crowd of spectators, most of them standing.

References

1730 establishments in England
Cricket grounds in Surrey
Cricket in Surrey
Defunct cricket grounds in England
Defunct sports venues in Surrey
English cricket venues in the 18th century
History of Surrey
Sport in Surrey
Sports venues completed in 1730
Sports venues in Guildford
Sports venues in Surrey
Surrey